Walter Adams may refer to:

People 
Walter Adams (economist) (1922–1998), American university professor and president
Walter Adams (bishop) (1877–1957), Canadian religious leader who served as the Anglican Archbishop of British Columbia
Walter Sydney Adams (1876–1956), American astronomer
Walter Adams (runner) (born 1945), German runner
Sir Walter Adams (historian) (1906–1975), economist, principal of the University College of Rhodesia and director of the London School of Economics
Walter Adams (footballer), English professional footballer
Walter Adams (politician) (1830–1892), Australian businessman, sugar planter and politician
Walter Adams, character in Alice Adams (film)
Walter Adams (wrestler)

Ships 
Walter Adams Coxen (1870–1949), Australian Army Major General in World War I
USS Walter Adams (SP-400) or ID-400, a US Navy patrol vessel in commission from 1918 to 1919

See also
Adams (surname)